Statistic for busiest airports in Vietnam is supplied by Airports Corporation of Vietnam (ACV). In 2016, ACV is operating 22 airports, of which 9 are international.

Passenger traffic 
{| class="wikitable sortable"
|-

!No.
!Airport name
!Province
!City served
!IATA
!ICAO
!The data-sort-type=number|2012
!The data-sort-type=number|2013
!The data-sort-type=number|2014
!The data-sort-type=number|2015
!The data-sort-type=number|2016
!The data-sort-type=number|2017
!The data-sort-type=number|2018
!The data-sort-type=number|2019
!The data-sort-type=number|2020
|-
|1
|Tan Son Nhat International Airport
|Ho Chi Minh City
|Ho Chi Minh City
|SGN
|VVTS
|17,538,353
|20,035,152
|22,153,349
|26,546,475
|32,486,537
|35,996,014
|38,414,737
|41,243,240
|22,000,000
|-
|2
|Noi Bai International Airport
|Hanoi
|Hanoi
|HAN
|VVNB
|11,341,039
|12,825,784
|14,190,675
|17,213,715
|20,596,632
|23,824,400
|25,908,048
|29,304,631
|-
|3 
|Da Nang International Airport
|Da Nang
|Da Nang
|DAD
|VVDN
|3,090,877
|4,376,775
|4,989,687
|6,722,587
|8,783,429
|10,801,927
|13,229,663
|15,543,598
|-
|4
|Cam Ranh International Airport
|Khanh Hoa
|Nha Trang
|CXR
|VVCR
|1,095,776
|1,509,212
|2,062,494
|2,722,833
|4,858,362
|6,500,000
|8,250,000
|9,747,172
|-
|5
|Phu Quoc International Airport
|Kien Giang
|Phu Quoc
|PQC
|VVPQ
|493,434
|685,036
|1,002,750
|1,467,043
|2,278,814
|3,000,000
|3,200,000
|3,700,205
|-
|6
|Cat Bi International Airport
|Hai Phong
|Hai Phong
|HPH
|VVCI
|683,574
|872,762
|927,001
|1,256,719
|1,800,000
|2,089,000
|2,373,700
|2,639,000
|-
|7
|Vinh Airport
|Nghe An
|Vinh 
|VII
|VVVH
|635,277
|917,638
|1,222,698
|1,300,000
|1,563,387
|1,800,000
|1,880,000
|1,950,000
|2,000,000
|-
|8
|Phu Bai International Airport
|Thua Thien-Hue
|Hue
|HUI
|VVPB
|673,044
|427,582
|1,159,499
|1,300,000
|1,550,000
|1,750,000
|1,831,000
| 1,931,939
|-
|9
|Lien Khuong Airport
|Lam Dong
|Da Lat
|DLI
|VVDL
|387,925
|476,438
|675,607
|862,164
|1,262,513
|1,530,000
|1,690,000
|2,000,000
|-
|10
|Buon Ma Thuot Airport
|Dak Lak
|Buon Me Thuot
|BMV
|VVBM
|410,724
|535,084
|695,147
|830,000
|1,220,000
|data-sort-value="1220000" 
|908,000
|data-sort-value="908000" 
|-
|11
|Phu Cat Airport 
|Binh Dinh
|Quy Nhon
|UIH
|VVPC
|236,254
|290,832
|420,520
|630,935
|1,030,000
|1,500,000
|1,126,156
|data-sort-value="1126156" 
|data-sort-value="1126156" 
|-
|12
|Can Tho International Airport
|Can Tho
|Can Tho
|VCA
|VVCT
|200,751
|241,307
|305,015
|481,447
|550,090
|612,512
|834,000
|data-sort-value="834000" 
|-
|13
|Pleiku Airport
|Gia Lai
|Pleiku
|PXU
|VVPK
|319,833
|319,994
|300,471
|237,564
|797,509
|753,784
|720,000
|data-sort-value="720000" 
|-
|14
|Con Dao Airport
|Bà Rịa–Vũng Tàu
|Con Dao
|VCS
|VVCS
|191,039
|175,574
|188,549
|data-sort-value="188549" 
|294,000
|400,000
|412,000
|430,841
|447,750
|-
|15
|Tho Xuan Airport
|Thanh Hoa
|Thanh Hoa 
|THD
|VVTX
|data-sort-value="0" 
|90,929
|163,270
|570,713
|828,930
|865,534
|939,000
|1,000,000
|data-sort-value="1000000" 
|-
|16
|Dong Hoi Airport
|Quang Binh
|Dong Hoi
|VDH
|VVDH
|81,764
|105,586
|117,656
|261,372
|365,000
|470,000
|534,856
|539,908
|487,746
|-
|17
|Dien Bien Airport
|Dien Bien
|Dien Bien Phu
|DIN
|VVDB
|73,372
|74,272
|81,564
|data-sort-value="81564" 
|70,302
|70,486
|58,000
|57,339
|data-sort-value="57339" 
|-
|18
|Tuy Hoa Airport
|Phu Yen
|Tuy Hoa
|TBB
|VVTH
|62,825
|63,103
|64,037
|107,843
|326,982
|337,000
|403,000
|433,285
|361,181
|-
|19
|Chu Lai International Airport
|Quảng Nam
|Tam Ky
|VCL
|VVCA
|53,753
|50,974
|40,198
|154,549
|553,285
|673,000
|760,000
|944,313
|data-sort-value="944313" 
|-
|20
|Rach Gia Airport
|Kien Giang
|Rach Gia
|VKG
|VVRG
|60,180
|52,409
|33,544
|data-sort-value="33544" 
|data-sort-value="33544" 
|data-sort-value="33544" 
|35,500
|data-sort-value="35,500" 
|data-sort-value="35,500" 
|-
|21
|Van Don International Airport
|Quang Ninh
|Hạ Long
|VDO
|VVVD
| colspan="7" data-sort-value="0"  
| 260,434
|-
|22
|Ca Mau Airport
|Ca Mau
|Ca Mau
|CAH
|VVCM
|37,995
|34,400
|30,698
|data-sort-value="30698" 
|data-sort-value="30698" 
|data-sort-value="30698" 
|38,500
|data-sort-value="38,500" 
|-
|23
|Na San Airport
|Son La
|Son La
|SQH
|VVNS
| colspan="8" data-sort-value="0"  

Na San Airport has had no regular route since 2001 while Tho Xuan Airport was not in service in 2012.

Cargo traffic
All figures are in metric tonnes.

References 

Vietnam
Airports, Busiest